Serrodes campana is a species of moth of the family Erebidae first described by Achille Guenée in 1852. It is found from the Indo-Australian tropics to eastern Australia, Fiji, Samoa and New Caledonia. It is also present in Japan, Korea and Sri Lanka. The adult is a fruit piercer, but also feeds on flower nectar.

Description
The wingspan is about 80 mm. Head, thorax and basal and outer area of forewings brown and markings larger than other species. Forewings with a sub-basal dark red-brown spot on the costa, with a line from its lower edge. A similar antemedial spot and large lunule found below the cell with a highly excurved line from its lower edge. Reniform broken up into a number of tessellated spots with pale edges, and with rufous marks on the costa above it. A double straight postmedial line angled below the costa. Abdomen and hindwings are fuscous. Hindwings have traces of a medial pale line. Cilia paler at apex and anal angle.

Larva ochreous blue grey with bluish-black speckles. The first abdominal segment black and swollen. All the legs are ochreous. The larvae feed on Lepisanthes, Nephelium, Sapindus, Schleichera and Acer species. They are ochreous blue grey, finely and densely speckled with bluish black, the spiracular zone of the abdomen forming a darker but irregular band with a more rufous edging above and below. All the legs are ochreous.

Subspecies
Serrodes campana campana
Serrodes campana callipepla Prout, 1929

Gallery

References

Serrodes
Moths of Asia
Fauna of the Gambia
Moths of Africa
Moths described in 1852